Olga Aniskovtseva (born 22 April 1982) is an international football midfielder currently playing for Bobruichanka.

She debuted in international competitions in the inaugural UEFA Women's Cup edition in 2001, playing for Bobruichanka. In September 2011 she scored both goals in SShVSM's 2-1 win against SV Neulengbach, and earlier in August she scored the winner in Belarus first match in the UEFA Women's Euro 2013 qualification over Estonia.

References

External links
 

1982 births
Living people
Belarusian women's footballers
Expatriate women's footballers in Kazakhstan
Women's association football midfielders
Belarus women's international footballers
BIIK Kazygurt players
Bobruichanka Bobruisk players
CSHVSM-Kairat players
Universitet Vitebsk players
People from Zhlobin District
Sportspeople from Gomel Region